Pelican Portage is a settlement in northern Alberta, Canada within the Municipal District of Opportunity No. 17.

Pelican Portage had its own postmaster Georg Naumann worked since 1939 for the District of Athabasca / Alberta with private office.

See also 

 List of communities in Alberta
 List of settlements in Alberta

References 

Municipal District of Opportunity No. 17